Tears from a Grieving Heart is the debut studio album by the Australian doom metal band Mournful Congregation. It is regarded as a pioneering release in the funeral doom subgenre. It was originally recorded as a demo but was re-released as a CD in September 2012 by American record label 20 Buck Spin, with a slightly altered track listing and a bonus track. The band has stated in interviews that it is their first full-length album. It is also the final Mournful Congregation release to be recorded as a duo and the first to feature drummer Adrian Bickle, after the departure of band co-founder Ben Petch the previous year following the An Epic Dream of Desire demo, although he has writing credits on this record.

Track listing

Original version

CD version

Personnel
Mournful Congregation
Damon Good – Vocals, guitar, bass guitar
Adrian Bickle – Drums
Additional personnel
Ben Petch – songwriting
Anne O'Neill – cover art
Pat di Palo – layout
Steve Fieldhouse – mixing, mastering

References
 

Mournful Congregation albums
2002 debut albums